Shesh Khaneh (also Romanized as Shesh Khāneh) is a village in Atrak Rural District, Maneh District, Maneh and Samalqan County, North Khorasan Province, Iran. At the 2006 census, its population was 185, in 38 families.

References 

Populated places in Maneh and Samalqan County